Osinovo is a rural locality (a village) in Krasnopolyanskoye Rural Settlement, Nikolsky District, Vologda Oblast, Russia. The population was 309 as of 2002. There are 11 streets.

Geography 
Osinovo is located 11 km southwest of Nikolsk (the district's administrative centre) by road. Levoberezhny is the nearest rural locality.

References 

Rural localities in Nikolsky District, Vologda Oblast